Senior aircraftman (SAC) or senior aircraftwoman (SACW) was a rank in the Royal Air Force, ranking between leading aircraftman and senior aircraftman technician (SAC(T)) (although SACs in non-technical trades progress directly to corporal) and having a NATO rank code of OR-2. The rank, which is non-supervisory, was introduced on 1 January 1951. The rank badge is a three-bladed propeller. The rank was renamed Air Specialist (class 1) (AS1) in the Royal Air Force in July 2022.

The rank is also used in the Air Force of Zimbabwe.

Rank insignia
The senior aircraftman rank badge is a three-bladed propeller and it is worn of the shoulder when in working dress and on the upper sleeve in service dress.

Senior aircraftman (technician)
From March 2005, SACs in technical trades who had attained the Operational Performance Standard were promoted to Senior aircraftman technician SAC Tech and given a new badge of rank, consisting of the three-bladed propeller inside a circle. This new rank was introduced, to distinguish airmen trained to work unsupervised from those who were not, and is equivalent to the old junior technician rank.

See also
RAF other ranks

Footnotes

Military ranks of the Royal Air Force
Air force ranks